Pirouz Adamiat (born 19 June 1949) is an Iranian fencer. He competed in the individual épée event at the 1972 Summer Olympics.

References

External links
 

1949 births
Living people
Iranian male épée fencers
Olympic fencers of Iran
Fencers at the 1972 Summer Olympics
Asian Games gold medalists for Iran
Asian Games silver medalists for Iran
Asian Games medalists in fencing
Fencers at the 1974 Asian Games
Medalists at the 1974 Asian Games
20th-century Iranian people
21st-century Iranian people